Upon Us is the second album by American alternative metal band Taproot. It was released in 1999. This album is notable for featuring highlights of material from their first album ...Something More Than Nothing and the hard-to-find EP Mentobe.

Like ...Something More Than Nothing, this album is difficult to find, but often can be found on fan forums, blogs, and torrent sites.

Track listing

Notes
Tracks 1, 2, 5, 7, and 8 were reworked for their major label debut Gift.
The lyrics to "Fear to See" were used for a remake of the song "Mirror's Reflection".

Personnel
 Stephen Richards – lead vocals
 Mike DeWolf – guitar
 Phil Lipscomb – bass
 Jarrod Montague – drums, backing vocals

References

Taproot (band) albums
1999 albums